Ángel Herrero may refer to:

Ángel Herrero (footballer, born 1942), Spanish footballer
Ángel Herrero (footballer, born 1949), Spanish footballer

See also
Ángel Herrera (disambiguation)